Transylvanian Saxon (endonym:  or just , , , or , obsolete German spelling: Siebenbürgisch Teutsch, Transylvanian Landler dialect: Soksisch, or ) is the German dialect of the Transylvanian Saxons, an ethnic German minority group from Transylvania, central Romania. 

The Transylvanian Saxon dialect is very close to Luxembourgish given the fact that many ancestors of the modern Transylvanian Saxons stemmed from present-day Luxembourg as early as the 12th century, especially in the area of contemporary Sibiu County, as part of the Ostsiedlung process in order to settle in southern, southeastern, and northeastern Transylvania for economic development, guarding the easternmost borders of the former Kingdom of Hungary as well as mining. Consequently, it has been spoken in the south, southeast, and northeast of Transylvania since the High Middle Ages onwards. The Transylvanian Saxon dialect is also similar to Zipser German dialect spoken by the Zipsers in Slovakia and Romania.

There are two main types or varieties of the dialect, more specifically northern Transylvanian Saxon, spoken in Nösnerland including the dialect of Bistrița (obsolete or old German name: Nösen), and south Transylvanian Saxon, including, most notably, the dialect of Sibiu. In the process of its development, the Transylvanian Saxon dialect has been influenced by Romanian as well.

Background 

In terms of comparative linguistics, it pertains to the Moselle Franconian group of West Central German dialects. In this particular regard, it must be mentioned that it shares a consistent amount of lexical similarities with Luxembourgish.

The dialect was mainly spoken in Transylvania (contemporary central Romania), by native speakers of German, Flemish, and Walloon origins who were settled in the Kingdom of Hungary starting in the mid and mid-late 12th century (more specifically from approximately the 1140s to the 19th century). Over the passing of time, it had been consistently influenced by both Romanian and Hungarian given the centuries-long cohabitation of the Saxons with Romanians and Hungarians (mostly Szeklers) in the south, southeast, and northeast of Transylvania. The main areas where Transylvanian Saxon was spoken in Transylvania were southern and northern Transylvania.

In the contemporary era, the vast majority of the native speakers have emigrated in several waves, initially to Germany and Austria, but then subsequently to the USA, Canada as well as other Western European countries, managing in the process to preserve (at least temporarily) their specific language there.

Lastly, one can perceive the Transylvanian Saxon dialect, bearing in mind its conservative character when compared to other dialects of the German language (due primarily to its geographic isolation from other German idioms) as a type of German spoken in medieval times, or, more specifically as Old High German or Middle High German.

Distribution of the dialect in Transylvania 

Traditionally, the Transylvanian Saxon dialect was mainly spoken in the rural areas of Transylvania throughout the passing of time, since the arrival of the Transylvanian Saxons in the Carpathian Basin during the Middle Ages (more specifically High Middle Ages) onwards. In the urban settlements (i.e. towns and cities), standard German (i.e. Hochdeutsch) was more spoken and written.

Furthermore, the Transylvanian Saxon dialect also varied from village to village where it was spoken (a village could have had a slightly different form of Transylvanian Saxon than the other but there was still a certain degree of mutual intelligibility between them; for instance, more or less analogous to how English accents vary on a radius of 5 miles in the United Kingdom).

Recent history of the dialect (1989–present) 

Before the Romanian Revolution of 1989, most of the Transylvanian Saxons were still living in Transylvania. During the communist dictatorship of Nicolae Ceaușescu, many thousands of these Saxons were sold for a total sum of money of around $6 million paid to communist Romania by West Germany.

By 1990, the number of Saxons living in Transylvania had decreased dramatically. Shortly after the fall of communism, from 1991 to 1994, many Transylvanian Saxons who still remained in Transylvania decided to ultimately emigrate to re-unified Germany, leaving just a minority of approximately 20,0000 Transylvanian Saxons in Romania at the round of the 21st century (or less than 1 percent of the entire population of Transylvania).

The number of native Transylvanian Saxon speakers today is estimated at approximately 200,000 persons. Transylvanian Saxon is also the native dialect of the current President of Romania, Klaus Iohannis, by virtue of the fact that he is a Transylvanian Saxon. It is also the native dialect of well known German rock superstar Peter Maffay. Additionally, according to the 2011 Romanian census, only 11,400 Transylvanian Saxon were still living in Transylvania at that time. The 2022 Romanian census will most likely report an even fewer number of native Transylvanian Saxon speakers still left in Transylvania.

Sample text 

Below is a sample text written in the Transylvanian Saxon dialect, entitled 'De Råch' (meaning 'The Revenge'), which is, more specifically, an old traditional ballad/poem (also translated and in comparison with standard German/Hochdeutsch and English):

Below is another sample text of religious nature, more specifically the Our Father prayer:

Alphabet
 A - a
 B - be
 C - ce
 D - de
 E - e
 F - ef
 G - ge
 H - ha
 I - i
 J - jot
 K - ka
 L - el
 M - em
 N - en
 O - o
 P - pe
 Q - ku
 R - er
 S - es
 T - te
 U - u
 V - vau
 W - we
 X - ix
 Y - ipsilon
 Z - zet

Orthography and pronunciation

Vowels
 a - [a/aː]
 au - [aʊ̯]
 å - [ɔː]
 ä - [ɛ/ɛː]
 äi - [eɪ̯]
 e - [ɛ~e~ə/eː]
 ei - [aɪ̯]
 ë - [e]
 i - [ɪ/iː]
 ië - [i]
 o - [ɔ/oː]
 u - [ʊ/uː]
 uë - [u]
 ü/y - [ʏ/yː]

Consonants
 b - [b~p]
 c - [k~g̊]
 ch - [x~ʃ]
 ck - [k]
 d - [d~t]
 dsch - [d͡ʒ]
 f - [f]
 g - [g~k~ʃ]
 h - [h~ː]
 j - [j]
 k - [k~g̊]
 l - [l]
 m - [m]
 n - [n]
 ng - [ŋ]
 nj - [ɲ]
 p - [p~b̥]
 pf - [p͡f]
 qv - [kv]
 r - [r~∅]
 s - [s~ʃ~z]
 sch - [ʃ]
 ss - [s]
 t - [t~d̥]
 tsch - [t͡ʃ]
 v - [f/v]
 w - [v]
 x - [ks]
 z - [t͡s]

Bibliography
 Siebenbürgisch-Sächsisches Wörterbuch. A. Schullerus, B. Capesius, A. Tudt, S. Haldenwang et al. (in German)
 Band 1, Buchstabe A – C, 1925, de Gruyter, ASIN: B0000BUORT
 Band 2, Buchstabe D – F, 1926, de Gruyter, ASIN: B0000BUORU
 Band 3, Buchstabe G,     1971, de Gruyter, ASIN: B0000BUORV
 Band 4, Buchstabe H – J, 1972
 Band 5, Buchstabe K,     1975
 Band 6, Buchstabe L,     1997, Böhlau Verlag, 
 Band 7: Buchstabe M,     1998,  Böhlau Verlag, 
 Band 8, Buchstabe N - P, 2002, Böhlau Verlag, 
 Band 9: Buchstabe Q - R, 2007, Böhlau Verlag,

Notes

References

External links 

 SibiWeb: Die Sprache des siebenbürgisch-sächsischen Volkes von Adolf Schullerus (German)
 Verband der Siebenbürgersachsen in Deutschland: Sprachaufnahmen in siebenbürgisch-sächsischer Mundart - Audiosamples (German, Såksesch)
 Siebenbürgersachsen Baden-Württemberg: Die Mundart der Siebenbürger Sachsen von Waltraut Schuller (German)
 Hörprobe in Siebenbürgersächsisch (Mundart von Honigberg - Hărman) und Vergleich mit anderen Germanischen Sprachen (German)

 
Central German languages
German dialects
Languages of Romania
Languages of Hungary
Severely endangered languages